Deoxyguanosine triphosphate (dGTP) is a nucleoside triphosphate, and a nucleotide precursor used in cells for DNA synthesis. The substance is used in the polymerase chain reaction technique, in sequencing, and in cloning. It is also the competitor of inhibition onset by acyclovir in the treatment of HSV virus.

References

Nucleotides
Phosphate esters